Arthur Valentine Mauro,  (born February 15, 1927) is a Canadian lawyer and businessman.

Born in Thunder Bay, Ontario, he studied law at the University of Manitoba and was president of the University of Manitoba Students' Union.  He  was called to the Bar of Manitoba in 1953. Until 1969 he practiced law, specializing in transportation and communication law. In 1967, he was appointed chairman of the Royal Commission on Northern Transportation.

In 1969, he became a senior executive with Great Northern Capital Corporation. From 1972 to 1976, he was president and chief executive officer of Transair Limited. In 1976, he joined the Investors Group, becoming president, chief executive officer and chairman.

In 1991, he was elected chancellor of the University of Manitoba, serving until 2000. From 2009 through 2012, he served as chancellor of Lakehead University.

Honours
In 1987, he was made a member of the Order of Canada and was promoted to officer in 1992. In 2004, he was awarded the Order of Manitoba.

References

External links
 Arthur Mauro is Lakehead's New Chancellor

1927 births
Possibly living people
Businesspeople from Ontario
Businesspeople from Manitoba
Canadian university and college chancellors
Canadian people of Italian descent
Officers of the Order of Canada
Members of the Order of Manitoba
People from Thunder Bay